A Twinkie is a snack cake with a cream filling.

Twinkie(s) may also refer to:

 Twinkie (slur), a pejorative term
 Twinkie Clark (b. 1954), a musician
Twinkies, a nickname for the Minnesota Twins
 Twinkie, a character from the Fast & Furious franchise most notably from The Fast and the Furious: Tokyo Drift

See also
 Twinkie defense, a legal strategy
 Banana, Coconut, and Twinkie
 Twinky, the original British title of Lola (1969 film)
 Twink (disambiguation)